The first government of Susana Díaz was formed on 10 September 2013 following the latter's election as President of Andalusia by the Parliament of Andalusia on 5 September and her swearing-in on 7 September, as a result of the resignation of the former president, José Antonio Griñán, over the erosion of the ERE scandal, a large slush fund corruption scandal involving former leading figures of the regional PSOE's branch, including former development minister Magdalena Álvarez, with former Andalusian president Manuel Chaves and himself being accused of knowing and concealing such a plot.

Until January 2015, the cabinet comprised members of the PSOE–A (including one independent) and IULV–CA, to become the second coalition government between the two parties in the region and the fourth coalition government in the region overall. On 27 January 2015, president Díaz expelled all IU members from the cabinet under a pretext to call for a snap election amid increasing instability within the governing coalition. It was automatically dismissed on 23 March 2015 as a consequence of the 2015 regional election, but remained in acting capacity until the next government was sworn in.

Investiture

Council of Government
The Council of Government was structured into the offices for the president, the vice president and 11 ministries.

Notes

References

2013 establishments in Andalusia
2015 disestablishments in Andalusia
Cabinets established in 2013
Cabinets disestablished in 2015
Cabinets of Andalusia